Creator Clash is a charity boxing event between content creators. The inaugural event took place on May 14, 2022, at the Yuengling Center on the campus of the University of South Florida in Tampa, Florida.  The headlining fight of this event was between YouTubers iDubbbz and Doctor Mike. The event featured other popular creators such as AB "Starkilla" Ayad of the H3 Podcast, Harley Morenstein (of Epic Meal Time), Arin Hanson (of Game Grumps), TheOdd1sOut, Michael Reeves (of OfflineTV) and Ryan Magee and Matt Watson of SuperMega, and Dad, portrayed by Nathan Barnatt. This event also featured the first fight between female content creators as JustaMinx faced Yodeling Haley. The event was organized by iDubbbz, his wife Anisa, and co-creator Mike Leanardi with the events company Real Good Touring.

Background 
In 2018, YouTuber iDubbbz called out fellow YouTuber RiceGum in a video entitled Content Cop - Jake Paul. After the release of iDubbbz's video, RiceGum challenged him to a boxing match. In a video uploaded in October 2021, it was revealed by iDubbbz that RiceGum had backed out of the fight and he was actively searching for new creators to join his planned event. This would eventually evolve into the "Creator Clash".

The 2022 event featured many different creators from different genres of content, most who had never previously boxed before starting training for their respective fights. iDubbbz stated that he wanted this event to feel different from previous YouTuber boxing matches and ensured that fighters were taking it seriously. The proceeds of the original Creator Clash, which iDubbbz stated was "close to a million dollars", were donated to the American Heart Association, the Alzheimer's Association, and the Healing Horse Therapy Center.

Creator Clash (2022 event) 
The inaugural event took place on May 14, 2022, at the Yuengling Center on the campus of the University of South Florida in Tampa, Florida.

Fight card 

Note 1.Originally planned to complete 3 minute rounds for 4.

The fight was broadcast live on event-streaming platform Moment House. The broadcast featured live commentary from Akinola Verissimo, Wade Plemons, FaZe Sensei, MoistCr1TiKaL, EsfandTV, and Chills. The broadcast sold over 100,000 pay-per-view buys.

Creator Clash 2 
iDubbbz has confirmed a follow-up event. On January 24, 2023, iDubbbz announced that Creator Clash 2 would take place on April 15, 2023 at Amalie Arena in Tampa, Florida. The main event is set to be iDubbbz vs. YouTuber Alex Wassabi, with returning fighters including Haley Sharpe, AB Ayad, and Alex Apollonov. The event is also slated to include JackSepticEye and Markiplier as show commentators.

References 

Boxing matches
YouTube Boxing events
YouTube
Crossover boxing events
Events in Florida
2022 in boxing
2022 in Internet culture